J. Mohamed Shanavas (born 22 April 1982), known as Aloor Sha Navas, is an Indian politician, writer, and social worker from Tamil Nadu. He is currently the Deputy Secretary General of Viduthalai Chiruthaigal Katchi. Since 2021, he is an elected member of the Tamil Nadu Legislative Assembly representing the Nagapattinam constituency.

Early life and education
Shanavas was born into a middle-class family in Aloor near Nagercoil in Kanyakumari District. His parents are Jainul Abideen and Raabiyath Beevi. He is married to Parveen. They have a son together.

Politics
In 2016, he stood for his first Tamil Nadu state legislative assembly elections from the Kunnam constituency. He was the joint candidate of the People's Welfare Front Alliance. He garnered just 19,853 votes and lost the elections to R. T. Ramachandran (politician) by a huge margin. 

In 2021, he stood for elections from the Nagapattinam Assembly constituency as the candidate for Viduthalai Chiruthaigal Katchi (VCK). He defeated his nearest AIADMK rival with an individual 'pot' symbol as a part of the DMK-led alliance.

Currently, he also serves as the Deputy General Secretary of VCK party, a Dravidian Tamil Nationalist caste base political party. He is a strong follower of Thanthai Periyar, Muhammad Ismail and B.R.Ambedkar.

Activism 
Shanavas has written six books and directed three documentaries to highlight the issues in the country.

Shanavas received death threats from a BJP worker who said in social media that a news of Shanavas will come soon as a prize for victory of the BJP in 4 seats in the state. The BJP worker was later arrested by the police.

Awards and honours
Shanavas was entitled,

"Tamil Marabu Kaavalar" at Tamil Heritage Convention by Canada Tamil Sangam in 2017.

Young Media Activist award from Kuwait Tamil Islamic Committee.

Ilam Pirai Award from Kuwait.

Young Writer Award-Athayi Arabic College, Chennai.

References

External links
 About Aloor Shanavas
 Official facebook
 Official twitter

Living people
Tamil Nadu politicians
Tamil activists
Viduthalai Chiruthaigal Katchi politicians
1982 births
Indian Muslims
People from Kanyakumari district
Tamil Nadu MLAs 2021–2026